Two Little Pieces is a series two small pieces for solo classical guitar, composed by Takashi Yoshimatsu in 1994. It was written as a subset of pieces that the composer wrote for classical guitarist Kazuhito Yamashita, originally composed for the piano or harp. The composer describes the work as an "envocation of a lonely fish and a white view".

The sheet music for these pieces was issued together in Yoshimatsu Collected Works Vol. 2 for Guitar.

List set of Two Little Pieces 
Both pieces are in written in 2/4 timing and played in standard tuning.

 I. Canticle – A canticle written in the key of G major and the tempo is indicated as adagio.
 II. Noël – A piece written in the key of E major and the tempo is indicated as largo.

Recordings 

 Wind Colour Vector: Yamashita Plays Yoshimatsu performed by Kazuhito Yamashita.
 Meditations – Works for Guitar performed by Craig Ogden.

References

External links 
 Takashi Yoshimatsu

Compositions for guitar
Compositions by Takashi Yoshimatsu